The Queen's Journal is the main student-run newspaper at Queen's University at Kingston in Kingston, Ontario. The paper was founded in 1873 and has been continually publishing ever since. It is as old as The Harvard Crimson, the oldest continuously published student newspaper in the United States. The Journal is published twice a week, usually on Tuesdays and Fridays. The 2021-22 Editors in Chief are Aysha Tabassum and Shelby Talbot. The publication is an editorially autonomous paper, guaranteed by the Alma Mater Society of Queen's University and its constitution and by-laws.

The paper maintains a friendly rivalry with the campus' humour paper Golden Words. This is best exemplified by the annual publication, by Golden Words, of a fake edition of The Journal containing outlandish stories, published roughly around April Fool’s Day — although the exact date varies and the special edition is not marked in any way.

Journal alumni can often be found working for many of North America's major newspapers and media outlets. Notable names include Adam Shortt; former Ottawa mayor Charlotte Whitton; former Toronto Star editor-in-chief Giles Gherson; former Ottawa Citizen editor-in-chief Scott Anderson; former editor-in-chief of The Globe and Mail, John Stackhouse; former Toronto Star managing editor Jane Davenport; author, academic, and former Toronto Star columnist James Laxer; novelist Robertson Davies; Al Jazeera's Ali Velshi; Toronto Star reporters Kristin Rushowy and Victoria Gibson; former ABC News correspondent Jeffrey Kofman; and Jeffrey Simpson, author and former political columnist for The Globe and Mail.

See also
 CFRC-FM
 List of newspapers in Canada
 List of student newspapers in Canada

References

External links
 
Queen's Journal print archives from 1873–1974

1873 establishments in Ontario
Newspapers published in Kingston, Ontario
Publications established in 1873
Journal
Student newspapers published in Ontario
Biweekly newspapers published in Canada